Robert Aschberg (born 19 March 1952 on Kungsholmen, in Stockholm) is a Swedish journalist and media executive. He works for the Swedish television channel TV3. Robert Aschberg was a Maoist in his youth, but in the seventies he left communism for mainstream entertainment. Robert is the grandson of Olof Aschberg, a Swedish bank entrepreneur.

References

External links

1952 births
Living people
Maoists
Journalists from Stockholm
People from Uppland
Swedish television journalists
Swedish television hosts
Swedish Jews